The Smolensk Oblast Duma is the regional parliament of Smolensk Oblast, a federal subject of Russia. A total of 48 deputies are elected for five-year terms.

Elections

2013

2018

References

Smolensk Oblast
Politics of Smolensk Oblast